Namayingo District is a district in Eastern Uganda. The district is named after its 'chief town', Namayingo, where the district headquarters are located.

Location
Namayingo District is located along the Equator. It is bordered by Bugiri District to the northwest, Busia District to the northeast, the Republic of Kenya to the east and southeast, the Republic of Tanzania to the south and Mayuge District to the west and southwest. The coordinates of the district are:00 17N, 33 51E.

Overview
The district was established by Act of Parliament and began functioning on 1 July 2010. Priotr to that it was part of Bugiri District. Namayingo District is part of Busoga sub-region. Other districts in Busoga include:

1. Buyende District

2. Iganga District

3. Jinja District

4. Kaliro District

5. Kamuli District

6. Luuka District

7. Mayuge District

8. Namutumba District.

Prior to 2000, the two main activities in the district were (a) subsistence agriculture on the mainland and (b) commercial fishing on the lakeshores and on the islands in Lake Victoria. During the 21st century, gold deposits have been discovered in the district. This has attracted many new residents to the area, performing such activities as: miners, washers, grinders, middlemen, buyers as well as salesmen of the hardware used in the artisanal gold mining industry, such as pick axes, shovels, pails, basins, ropes and ladders.

Population
The 1991 national population census estimated the district population at about 68,000. In 2002, the next national census put the population of the district at approximately 175,000. The district annual population growth rate was calculated at 2.9%. It is estimated that the population of Namayingo District was approximately 232,300 in 2012.

See also
 Namayingo
 Lake Victoria
 Kingdom of Busoga
 Districts of Uganda

References

External links
 Namayingo District Information Portal
The Evolution of Ugandan Districts

 
Districts of Uganda
Eastern Region, Uganda